En garde is French for "On [your] guard", a warning term in fencing.

En garde or En Garde may refer to:
 En Garde!, a 1975 role-playing game from Game Designers' Workshop
 En Garde!, a 1987 role-playing game from Ragnarök Speldesign
 En Garde (album), an album by the band Criteria
 "En Garde" (Modern Family), an episode of the television series Modern Family
 En Garde (novel), a novel in the Nancy Drew: Girl Detective series
 EnGarde Secure Linux